The Whitfield County School District is a public school district in Whitfield County, Georgia, United States, based in an unincorporated area with a Dalton postal address. It serves areas of Whitfield County outside of the Dalton city limits, including the communities of Cohutta, Tunnel Hill, and Varnell. Dalton residents are zoned to Dalton Public Schools.

History
Judy Gilreath became the superintendent in 2013.

Schools
The Whitfield County School District has thirteen elementary schools, five middle schools, four high schools, and one charter school.

High schools
Coahulla Creek High School
Northwest Whitfield County High School
Phoenix High School
Southeast Whitfield County High School
Alternative School - Crossroads Academy

Middle schools
Eastbrook Middle School
New Hope  Middle School
North Whitfield  Middle School
Valley Point  Middle School
Westside Middle School

Elementary schools
Antioch Elementary School
Beaverdale Elementary School
Cedar Ridge Elementary School
Cohutta  Elementary School
Dawnville  Elementary School
Dug Gap  Elementary School
Eastside  Elementary School
New Hope  Elementary School
Pleasant Grove  Elementary School
Tunnel Hill  Elementary School
Valley Point  Elementary School
Varnell  Elementary School
Westside Elementary School

Charter school
Whitfield County Career Academy

Other facilities
The administration building is outside of the Dalton city limits. The Student Services & Enrollment Building is within the Dalton city limits. The operations facility is not in the Dalton city limits.

References

External links

School districts in Georgia (U.S. state)
Education in Whitfield County, Georgia